Sokal ("falcon") is a surname. Notable people with the surname include:

 Alan Sokal (born 1955), American physicist and mathematician
 Anton Sokał-Kutyłoŭski, Belarusian independent activist
 Benoît Sokal (1954–2021), Belgian comics artist and video game developer
 Harry R. Sokal (1898–1979), Romanian-German film producer
 Harry Sokal (musician) (born 1954), Austrian saxophonist
 Michael Sokal, American historian
 Robert R. Sokal (1926–2012), American biostatistician
 Viktar Sokal, Belarusian footballers

See also
 

Belarusian-language surnames